Up Front was a United States-based electro-funk studio project, best known for their 10-minute track "Infatuation".

"Infatuation" was recognized and included on various post-disco compilation albums such as  The Perfect Beats, Vol. 2, released by Tommy Boy Records.

History
An early example of the New York Electro sound, "Infatuation" was one of the earliest influences of what would become known as freestyle; the tempo of this song is 122 beats per minute. Infatuation was written and produced by Eddie Colon and Fred Zarr with lyrics by W.Negron. The song was an NYC summer anthem and received heavy rotation on both New York and Miami Radio and clubs.  Infatuation was a particular favorite at the Funhouse where DJ John "Jellybean" Benitez, who actually "broke" the track, rocked the house.

Discography

Partial singles
"Infatuation"

Legacy
The track can be found on various compilation albums, including:
The Perfect Beats, Vol. 2, released  in 1998 by Tommy Boy.

References 

American boogie musicians
American freestyle music groups
American garage house musicians
Musical groups established in 1983
Musical groups from New York City